Antaeotricha sciospila is a moth in the family Depressariidae. It was described by Edward Meyrick in 1930. It is found in Brazil.

References

Moths described in 1930
sciospila
Moths of South America